Foliabitus is a genus of Asian jumping spiders that was first described by J. X. Zhang & Wayne Paul Maddison in 2012.  it contains only two species, found only in Asia: F. longzhou and F. scutigerus.

References

Salticidae genera
Salticidae
Spiders of Asia